The Maranhão red-handed howler (Alouatta ululata) is an endangered species of howler monkey endemic to forests (for example Babaçu forests) in the northeastern Brazilian states of Ceará, Maranhão and Piauí. It was previously thought to be a subspecies of the red-handed howler, but unlike that species, the Maranhão red-handed howler is strongly sexually dichromatic.

References

Maranhão red-handed howler
Mammals of Brazil
Endemic fauna of Brazil
Maranhão red-handed howler
Taxa named by Daniel Giraud Elliot